The 1987–88 Chicago Bulls season was the 22nd season of the franchise in the National Basketball Association (NBA). The Bulls finished second in the Central Division with a 50–32 record. Michael Jordan was named the league's Most Valuable Player and Defensive Player of the Year. He also won the All-Star Game MVP and Slam Dunk Contest during the All-Star Weekend, which was held in Chicago. In the first round of the playoffs, the Bulls defeated the Cleveland Cavaliers in five games, but lost to the Detroit Pistons in five games in the semifinals. Following the season, Charles Oakley was traded to the New York Knicks. The Bulls had the third best team defensive rating in the NBA.

NBA Draft

Note: This is not an extensive list; it only covers the first round, and notable post-first round picks.

Roster

Regular season

Jordan was indisputably great, and Oakley, who led the league in total rebounds (1,066), was outstanding. Still, the Bulls lacked a quality supporting cast. They took a major step toward alleviating that problem at the 1987 NBA Draft, when Vice President of Basketball Operations Jerry Krause acquired two players who would be vital cogs in Chicago's future championship machine. With two picks in the top 10, Krause selected Olden Polynice at No. 8 and Horace Grant at No. 10. He then traded Polynice and draft considerations to the Seattle SuperSonics for Scottie Pippen, whom the Sonics had grabbed with the fifth pick.

With Grant and Pippen on board the Bulls began to show their stuff in 1987–88, forging a 50–32 record, their best mark since 1973-74. Chicago finished in a second-place tie with Atlanta in a competitive Central Division won by the surging Detroit Pistons. The Bulls made some noise in the playoffs, defeating the Cleveland Cavaliers in a five-game first-round series, but then fell to Detroit in the Eastern Conference Semifinals.

Oakley and the Los Angeles Clippers' Michael Cage engaged in a nip-and-tuck battle for the league's rebounding title, which came down to the last day of the regular season. On April 22 against Cleveland, Oakley put the pressure on Cage by pulling down 35 rebounds, the second-highest total in Bulls history behind Tom Boerwinkle's 37 in 1970. Two days later, however, Cage grabbed 30 boards in a game against Seattle, just enough to edge Oakley by the slimmest of margins, 13.03 per game to 13.00. Cage played in 10 fewer games than Oakley, however, so Oakley led the NBA in total rebounds for the second consecutive year, with 1,066.

Jordan led the league in scoring (35.0 ppg) and steals (3.16 per game). He won almost every major award, including Most Valuable Player, Defensive Player of the Year, All-NBA First Team Honors and NBA All-Defensive First Team Honors. However, the finals and most important prizes eluded him until the 1990–1991 season.

Season standings

Record vs. opponents

Game log

Regular season

|- align="center" bgcolor="#ccffcc"
| 1
| November 7, 1987
| Philadelphia
| W 104–94
|
|
|
| Chicago Stadium
| 1–0
|- align="center" bgcolor="#ccffcc"
| 2
| November 10, 1987
| @ Atlanta
| W 105–95
|
|
|
| The Omni
| 2–0
|- align="center" bgcolor="#ccffcc"
| 3
| November 11, 1987
| @ New Jersey
| W 105–96
|
|
|
| Brendan Byrne Arena
| 3–0
|- align="center" bgcolor="#ccffcc"
| 4
| November 13, 1987
| New Jersey
| W 117–103
|
|
|
| Chicago Stadium
| 4–0
|- align="center" bgcolor="#ffcccc"
| 5
| November 14, 1987
| Indiana
| L 110–101
|
|
|
| Chicago Stadium
| 4–1
|- align="center" bgcolor="#ccffcc"
| 6
| November 17, 1987
| Washington
| W 105–101
|
|
|
| Chicago Stadium
| 5–1
|- align="center" bgcolor="#ccffcc"
| 7
| November 18, 1987
| @ Washington
| W 84–82
|
|
|
| Capital Centre
| 6–1
|- align="center" bgcolor="#ccffcc"
| 8
| November 20, 1987
| Atlanta
| W 94–92
|
|
|
| Chicago Stadium
| 7–1
|- align="center" bgcolor="#ffcccc"
| 9
| November 21, 19877:30 PM CST
| Detroit
| L 132–144 (OT)
|
|
|
| Chicago Stadium18,466
| 7–2
|- align="center" bgcolor="#ccffcc"
| 10
| November 23, 19876:30 PM CST
| @ Boston
| W 107–102
|
|
|
| Hartford Civic Center
| 8–2
|- align="center" bgcolor="#ccffcc"
| 11
| November 25, 1987
| @ Milwaukee
| W 103–101
|
|
|
| The MECCA
| 9–2
|- align="center" bgcolor="#ffcccc"
| 12
| November 27, 19877:00 PM CST
| @ Dallas
| L 93–94
|
|
|
| Reunion Arena17,007
| 9–3
|- align="center" bgcolor="#ccffcc"
| 13
| November 28, 1987
| @ Houston
| W 98–86
|
|
|
| The Summit
| 10–3

|- align="center" bgcolor="#ccffcc"
| 14
| December 1, 1987
| @ Golden State
| W 98–97
|
|
|
| Oakland–Alameda County Coliseum Arena
| 11–3
|- align="center" bgcolor="#ccffcc"
| 15
| December 2, 1987
| @ Utah
| W 105–101
|
|
|
| Salt Palace
| 12–3
|- align="center" bgcolor="#ffcccc"
| 16
| December 4, 1987
| @ Denver
| L 89–105
|
|
|
| McNichols Sports Arena
| 12–4
|- align="center" bgcolor="#ffcccc"
| 17
| December 5, 1987
| @ San Antonio
| L 101–110
|
|
|
| HemisFair Arena
| 12–5
|- align="center" bgcolor="#ffcccc"
| 18
| December 8, 1987
| Philadelphia
| L 96–109
|
|
|
| Chicago Stadium
| 12–6
|- align="center" bgcolor="#ccffcc"
| 19
| December 10, 1987
| Milwaukee
| W 111–105
|
|
|
| Chicago Stadium
| 13–6
|- align="center" bgcolor="#ccffcc"
| 20
| December 12, 1987
| Houston
| W 112–103
|
|
|
| Chicago Stadium
| 14–6
|- align="center" bgcolor="#ffcccc"
| 21
| December 15, 19877:00 PM CST
| @ Detroit
| L 123–127 (OT)
|
|
|
| Pontiac Silverdome23,729
| 14–7
|- align="center" bgcolor="#ccffcc"
| 22
| December 17, 1987
| Cleveland
| W 111–100
|
|
|
| Chicago Stadium
| 15–7
|- align="center" bgcolor="#ffcccc"
| 23
| December 19, 1987
| @ Washington
| L 96–109
|
|
|
| Capital Centre
| 15–8
|- align="center" bgcolor="#ffcccc"
| 24
| December 22, 19877:00 PM CST
| Dallas
| L 100–111
|
|
|
| Chicago Stadium18,103
| 15–9
|- align="center" bgcolor="#ffcccc"
| 25
| December 23, 1987
| @ New York
| L 89–90
|
|
|
| Madison Square Garden
| 15–10
|- align="center" bgcolor="#ffcccc"
| 26
| December 26, 1987
| @ Indiana
| L 92–106
|
|
|
| Market Square Arena
| 15–11
|- align="center" bgcolor="#ffcccc"
| 27
| December 29, 1987
| Atlanta
| L 98–108
|
|
|
| Chicago Stadium
| 15–12

|- align="center" bgcolor="#ccffcc"
| 28
| January 2, 1988
| New Jersey
| W 116–93
|
|
|
| Chicago Stadium
| 16–12
|- align="center" bgcolor="#ccffcc"
| 29
| January 5, 1988
| Indiana
| W 93–77
|
|
|
| Chicago Stadium
| 17–12
|- align="center" bgcolor="#ccffcc"
| 30
| January 7, 1988
| Denver
| W 100–96
|
|
|
| Chicago Stadium
| 18–12
|- align="center" bgcolor="#ccffcc"
| 31
| January 9, 1988
| Utah
| W 113–91
|
|
|
| Chicago Stadium
| 19–12
|- align="center" bgcolor="#ffcccc"
| 32
| January 12, 19887:00 PM CST
| Boston
| L 97–104
|
|
|
| Chicago Stadium
| 19–13
|- align="center" bgcolor="#ffcccc"
| 33
| January 14, 1988
| @ Cleveland
| L 88–91 (OT)
|
|
|
| Richfield Coliseum
| 19–14
|- align="center" bgcolor="#ccffcc"
| 34
| January 16, 19887:30 PM CST
| Detroit
| W 115–99
|
|
|
| Chicago Stadium18,676
| 20–14
|- align="center" bgcolor="#ccffcc"
| 35
| January 18, 1988
| Washington
| W 117–103
|
|
|
| Chicago Stadium
| 21–14
|- align="center" bgcolor="#ffcccc"
| 36
| January 19, 1988
| @ Atlanta
| L 94–106
|
|
|
| The Omni
| 21–15
|- align="center" bgcolor="#ccffcc"
| 37
| January 22, 1988
| Phoenix
| W 118–108
|
|
|
| Chicago Stadium
| 22–15
|- align="center" bgcolor="#ccffcc"
| 38
| January 23, 1988
| Golden State
| W 121–94
|
|
|
| Chicago Stadium
| 23–15
|- align="center" bgcolor="#ffcccc"
| 39
| January 26, 1988
| @ Indiana
| L 93–97
|
|
|
| Market Square Arena
| 23–16
|- align="center" bgcolor="#ccffcc"
| 40
| January 27, 1988
| @ Philadelphia
| W 119–109 (OT)
|
|
|
| The Spectrum
| 24–16
|- align="center" bgcolor="#ccffcc"
| 41
| January 29, 1988
| New Jersey
| W 120–93
|
|
|
| Chicago Stadium
| 25–16
|- align="center" bgcolor="#ccffcc"
| 42
| January 30, 1988
| New York
| W 97–95 (OT)
|
|
|
| Chicago Stadium
| 26–16

|- align="center" bgcolor="#ffcccc"
| 43
| February 1, 1988
| @ Sacramento
| L 95–97
|
|
|
| ARCO Arena
| 26–17
|- align="center" bgcolor="#ffcccc"
| 44
| February 2, 19889:30 PM CST
| @ L.A. Lakers
| L 101–110
| Michael Jordan (39)
|
|
| The Forum17,505
| 26–18
|- align="center" bgcolor="#ccffcc"
| 45
| February 4, 1988
| @ Phoenix
| W 113–101
|
|
|
| Arizona Veterans Memorial Coliseum
| 27–18
|- align="center"
|colspan="9" bgcolor="#bbcaff"|All-Star Break
|- style="background:#cfc;"
|- bgcolor="#bbffbb"
|- align="center" bgcolor="#ffcccc"
| 46
| February 9, 19887:30 PM CST
| Detroit
| L 74–89
|
|
|
| Chicago Stadium17,846
| 27–19
|- align="center" bgcolor="#ffcccc"
| 47
| February 10, 1988
| @ New Jersey
| L 84–93
|
|
|
| Brendan Byrne Arena
| 27–20
|- align="center" bgcolor="#ccffcc"
| 48
| February 12, 1988
| @ Milwaukee
| W 95–93
|
|
|
| The MECCA
| 28–20
|- align="center" bgcolor="#ffcccc"
| 49
| February 13, 19886:30 PM CST
| @ Detroit
| L 73–82
|
|
|
| Pontiac Silverdome40,369
| 28–21
|- align="center" bgcolor="#ccffcc"
| 50
| February 15, 1988
| Atlanta
| W 126–107
|
|
|
| Chicago Stadium
| 29–21
|- align="center" bgcolor="#ccffcc"
| 51
| February 19, 1988
| Sacramento
| W 116–101
|
|
|
| Chicago Stadium
| 30–21
|- align="center" bgcolor="#ffcccc"
| 52
| February 21, 1988
| @ Cleveland
| L 111–113
|
|
|
| Richfield Coliseum
| 30–22
|- align="center" bgcolor="#ccffcc"
| 53
| February 23, 1988
| Seattle
| W 104–97 (OT)
|
|
|
| Chicago Stadium
| 31–22
|- align="center" bgcolor="#ffcccc"
| 54
| February 26, 1988
| Portland
| L 96–104
|
|
|
| Chicago Stadium
| 33–21
|- align="center" bgcolor="#ffcccc"
| 55
| February 27, 1988
| Milwaukee
| L 91–94
|
|
|
| Chicago Stadium
| 33–22
|- align="center" bgcolor="#ffcccc"
| 56
| February 29, 1988
| @ Philadelphia
| L 101–102
|
|
|
| The Spectrum
| 33–23

|- align="center" bgcolor="#ccffcc"
| 57
| March 3, 1988
| Philadelphia
| W 97–93
|
|
|
| Chicago Stadium
| 33–24
|- align="center" bgcolor="#ccffcc"
| 58
| March 5, 1988
| L.A. Clippers
| W 100–76
|
|
|
| Chicago Stadium
| 34–24
|- align="center" bgcolor="#ffcccc"
| 59
| March 7, 1988
| @ New York
| L 98–110
|
|
|
| Madison Square Garden
| 34–25
|- align="center" bgcolor="#ccffcc"
| 60
| March 10, 19887:30 PM CST
| L.A. Lakers
| W 128–107
| Michael Jordan (38)
| Grant, Oakley (11)
| Sam Vincent (11)
| Chicago Stadium18,676
| 35–25
|- align="center" bgcolor="#ccffcc"
| 61
| March 12, 1988
| San Antonio
| W 112–92
|
|
|
| Chicago Stadium
| 36–25
|- align="center" bgcolor="#ccffcc"
| 62
| March 15, 1988
| Cleveland
| W 108–89
|
|
|
| Chicago Stadium
| 37–25
|- align="center" bgcolor="#ffcccc"
| 63
| March 16, 1988
| @ Washington
| L 103–106
|
|
|
| Capital Centre
| 37–26
|- align="center" bgcolor="#ccffcc"
| 64
| March 18, 19887:30 PM CST
| Boston
| W 113–103
|
|
|
| Chicago Stadium
| 38–26
|- align="center" bgcolor="#ffcccc"
| 65
| March 20, 198812 Noon PM CST
| @ Boston
| L 107–137
|
|
|
| Boston Garden
| 38–27
|- align="center" bgcolor="#ccffcc"
| 66
| March 23, 1988
| @ Philadelphia
| W 118–102
|
|
|
| The Spectrum
| 39–27
|- align="center" bgcolor="#ccffcc"
| 67
| March 25, 1988
| @ Cleveland
| W 111–110 (OT)
|
|
|
| Richfield Coliseum
| 40–27
|- align="center" bgcolor="#ccffcc"
| 68
| March 26, 1988
| Indiana
| W 109–100
|
|
|
| Chicago Stadium
| 41–27
|- align="center" bgcolor="#ffcccc"
| 69
| March 29, 1988
| @ Seattle
| L 103–106
|
|
|
| Seattle Center Coliseum
| 41–28
|- align="center" bgcolor="#ccffcc"
| 70
| March 30, 1988
| @ L.A. Clippers
| W 111–94
|
|
|
| Los Angeles Memorial Sports Arena
| 41–29

|- align="center" bgcolor="#ccffcc"
| 71
| April 1, 1988
| @ Portland
| W 116–101
|
|
|
| Memorial Coliseum
| 42–29
|- align="center" bgcolor="#ccffcc"
| 72
| April 3, 198812:30 PM CDT
| @ Detroit
| W 112–110
|
|
|
| Pontiac Silverdome23,712
| 43–29
|- align="center" bgcolor="#ffcccc"
| 73
| April 5, 1988
| Washington
| L 94–105
|
|
|
| Chicago Stadium
| 44–29
|- align="center" bgcolor="#ccffcc"
| 74
| April 6, 1988
| @ Milwaukee
| W 119–110
|
|
|
| The MECCA
| 44–30
|- align="center" bgcolor="#ccffcc"
| 75
| April 8, 1988
| New York
| W 131–122
|
|
|
| Chicago Stadium
| 45–30
|- align="center" bgcolor="#ccffcc"
| 76
| April 14, 1988
| @ Indiana
| W 116–110
|
|
|
| Market Square Arena
| 46–30
|- align="center" bgcolor="#ccffcc"
| 77
| April 15, 1988
| @ New Jersey
| W 100–99
|
|
|
| Brendan Byrne Arena
| 47–30
|- align="center" bgcolor="#ccffcc"
| 78
| April 17, 1988
| Milwaukee
| W 105–97
|
|
|
| Chicago Stadium
| 48–30
|- align="center" bgcolor="#ccffcc"
| 79
| April 19, 1988
| @ New York
| W 121–118
|
|
|
| Madison Square Garden
| 49–30
|- align="center" bgcolor="#ffcccc"
| 80
| April 21, 19886:30 PM CDT
| @ Boston
| L 119–126
|
|
|
| Boston Garden
| 49–31
|- align="center" bgcolor="#ffcccc"
| 81
| April 22, 1988
| Cleveland
| L 103–107
|
|
|
| Chicago Stadium
| 49–32
|- align="center" bgcolor="#ccffcc"
| 82
| April 24, 19882:30 PM CDT
| Boston
| W 115–108
|
|
|
| Chicago Stadium
| 50–32

Playoffs

|-
|- align="center" bgcolor="#ccffcc"
| 1
| April 28, 1988
| Cleveland
| W 104–93
| Michael Jordan (50)
| Charles Oakley (15)
| John Paxson (7)
| Chicago Stadium18,676
| 1–0
|- align="center" bgcolor="#ccffcc"
| 2
| May 1, 1988
| Cleveland
| W 106–101
| Michael Jordan (55)
| Charles Oakley (12)
| Sam Vincent (14)
| Chicago Stadium18,645
| 2–0
|- align="center" bgcolor="#ffcccc"
| 3
| May 3, 1988
| @ Cleveland
| L 102–110
| Michael Jordan (38)
| Charles Oakley (9)
| Michael Jordan (9)
| Richfield Coliseum20,068
| 2–1
|- align="center" bgcolor="#ffcccc"
| 4
| May 5, 1988
| @ Cleveland
| L 91–97
| Michael Jordan (44)
| Charles Oakley (10)
| Sam Vincent (5)
| Richfield Coliseum20,026
| 2–2
|- align="center" bgcolor="#ccffcc"
| 5
| May 8, 1988
| Cleveland
| W 107–101
| Michael Jordan (39)
| Charles Oakley (20)
| Rory Sparrow (7)
| Chicago Stadium18,008
| 3–2
|-

|-
|- align="center" bgcolor="#ffcccc"
| 1
| May 10, 19887:30 PM CDT
| @ Detroit
| L 82–93
| Michael Jordan (29)
| Charles Oakley (13)
| Michael Jordan (6)
| Pontiac Silverdome18,312
| 0–1
|- align="center" bgcolor="#ccffcc"
| 2
| May 12, 19887:00 PM CDT
| @ Detroit
| W 105–95
| Michael Jordan (36)
| Charles Oakley (12)
| Vincent, Pippen (5)
| Pontiac Silverdome20,281
| 1–1
|- align="center" bgcolor="#ffcccc"
| 3
| May 14, 198812 Noon CDT
| Detroit
| L 79–101
| Michael Jordan (24)
| Charles Oakley (12)
| Sam Vincent (6)
| Chicago Stadium18,676
| 1–2
|- align="center" bgcolor="#ffcccc"
| 4
| May 15, 19882:30 PM CDT
| Detroit
| L 77–96
| Michael Jordan (23)
| Charles Oakley (10)
| Michael Jordan (5)
| Chicago Stadium18,676
| 1–3
|- align="center" bgcolor="#ffcccc"
| 5
| May 18, 19887:00 PM CDT
| @ Detroit
| L 95–102
| Michael Jordan (25)
| Charles Oakley (15)
| Jordan, Paxson (8)
| Pontiac Silverdome21,371
| 1–4
|-

Player statistics

Season

Playoffs
Charles Oakley 14.3 ppg 15.6 reb 1.3 stl 2.4 blk 2.3 to

Awards and records
 Michael Jordan, NBA Most Valuable Player Award
 Michael Jordan, NBA Defensive Player of the Year Award
 Michael Jordan, NBA All-Star Weekend Slam Dunk Contest Winner
 Michael Jordan, NBA All-Star Game Most Valuable Player Award
 Jerry Krause, NBA Executive of the Year Award
 Michael Jordan, All-NBA First Team
 Michael Jordan, NBA All-Defensive First Team
 Michael Jordan, NBA All-Star Game

Transactions

1st Round, 8th overall Center Olden Polynice was drafted by the Bulls, but traded that same night with draft picks to the Seattle SuperSonics and the rights to the 5th overall pick Forward Scottie Pippen and draft picks.

Forward Horace Grant was drafted in the 1st Round, 10th overall by the Bulls.

References

See also
 1987–88 NBA season

Chicago Bulls seasons
Chicago Bulls
Chicago Bulls
Chicago Bulls